Graptolitic argillite (also known as dictyonema argillite, dictyonema oil shale, dictyonema shale, or Tremadocian black shale) is a marinite-type black shale of sapropelic origin. It is a blackish to greyish lithified claystone. The known occurrence of this rock is a graptolitic argillite of the Türisalu Formation in northern Estonia and northwest Russia.  It is correlated with Swedish alum shale being its younger facial eastward continuation, and both being a part of the Baltoscandic Cambrian-Ordovician black shale, together with black shales in the Oslo region in Norway, Bornholm, Denmark, and Poland.  Other known occurrences are in North America, the Malay Peninsula, and New Zealand.

Although the name dictyonema argillite is widely used instead of graptolitic argillite, this name is now considered a misnomer as the graptolite fossils in the rock, earlier considered dictyonemids, were reclassified during the 1980s as members of the genus Rhabdinopora.

It formed some 480 million years ago.

The composition of graptolitic argillite varies by location within Estonia.  Its organic content ranges from 10 to 20% and its sulfur content is 2–4%. Correspondingly, its calorific value is 5–8 megajoules per kilogram (MJ/kg) and Fischer Assay oil yield is 3–5%.  In northeastern Estonia its carbon-to-hydrogen atomic ratio is about nine. Graptolitic argillite from the northeastern region contains up to 9% pyrite (generally between 2.4 and 6%), heavy metals such as uranium (up to 1,200 parts per million (ppm) or 300 grammes per tonne (g/t)), molybdenum (up to 1,000 ppm or 600 g/t), vanadium (up to 1,600 ppm or 1,200 g/t), and nickel, and other minerals including K-feldspars, quartz, clay minerals, light-brown phosphatic ooids, and accessory amounts of zircon, tourmaline, garnet, rutile, chalcopyrite, and glauconite. Graptolitic argillite from the northwestern region contains fewer metals than are present in deposits in the northeast; it also contains more clay minerals.  Rock in these deposits contains corundum, amphiboles, and kyanite.

Geological reserves of graptolitic argillite in Estonia have been estimated at 60–70 billion tonnes.  Although the amount of graptolitic argillite exceeds that of kukersite, attempts to use it as an energy source have been unsuccessful due to its low calorific value and high content of sulfur.  However, it contains potentially about 2.1 billion tonnes of oil. In addition, graptolitic argillite in Estonia contains 5.67 million tonnes of uranium which makes it one of the main potential future uranium sources in Europe. Graptolitic argillite in Estonia also contains 16.53 million tonnes of zinc and 12.76 million tonnes of molybdenum; however, there is not yet any environmentally friendly and economically feasible technology to extract those metals.

Citations and references

Cited sources 
 

 

Oil shale geology
Geology of Estonia
Oil shale in Estonia